Lake Rossignol is the largest freshwater lake in Nova Scotia, Canada. It is located in the south-western interior of the province.

History 
The reservoir includes over a dozen former lakes, including First Lake, Second Lake, Third Lake (also known as Lake Rossignol), Fourth Lake, Fifth Lake, Yeadon Lake, Davis Lake, Kempton Lake, Low Lake, Menchan Lake, Lacey Lake, and Annis Lake.

Geography 
The size of the lake can allow strong winds to build up fetch, combined with numerous submerged trees and rocks as well as a variable water level (due to fluctuations in water demand at the dam), this can make Rossignol extremely dangerous for canoes and small boats.

Tourism 
Several canoe guides are available that cover Rossignol and the surrounding area.

See also 

List of lakes of Nova Scotia

References

External links 
Official Nova Scotia government website
Image showing the difference between the old and new lake levels

Lakes of Nova Scotia
Landforms of Queens County, Nova Scotia